Selehdar Kola (also Romanized as Şeleḩdār Kolā) is a village in Talarpey Rural District, in the Central District of Simorgh County, Mazandaran Province, Iran. At the 2006 census, its population was 112, in 28 families.

References 

Populated places in Simorgh County